"From Out of Nowhere" is the first track on Faith No More's third studio album, The Real Thing (1989). It was also the first single to be released from it and to feature Mike Patton on vocals. It was first released in the United Kingdom on October 30, 1989, but did not appear on the UK Singles Chart. It was re-released on April 2, 1990, after the success of "Epic", and it reached number 23 on the UK chart.

Music video
There are two very different versions of this video. The first version features Mike Patton in camouflage shorts, a black undershirt, and sunglasses. Words come across the screen a few times during the video, and there are a few shots of exteriors at the beginning and end. In the second version Patton is wearing spandex shorts and a black and blue coat. Billy Gould is using a different bass, and there are many more exterior shots, as well as more words going across the screen. Only a few shots are kept from the first version, being some of the shots of Mike Bordin. This latter version was used on the video releases. The band has said of the video that "[They] didn't know what [they] were doing".

Track listings
UK and European issue
 "From Out of Nowhere" – 3:23
 "Cowboy Song" – 5:12
 "The Grade" – 2:03

Australian issue
"From Out of Nowhere" – 3:23
"Edge of the World" – 4:10
"From Out of Nowhere" (Live at Brixton) – 3:24

UK and European reissue
 "From Out of Nowhere" (7-inch version†) / "From Out Of Nowhere (Extended Remix††)
 "Woodpecker from Mars" (live †††)
 "The Real Thing" (live †††)
 "Epic" (live †††)
† The 7-inch version was used on the CD, cassette and 7-inch editions of the reissue.
†† The Extended Remix was used on the 12-inch and 12-inch picture disc editions of the reissue.
††† Recorded in Norwich, February 6, 1990. Broadcast by The BBC Radio 1 "Rockshow", March 2, 1990. The profanity is obscured and the songs fade out.

Charts

Release history

Cover versions
 "From Out of Nowhere" was covered by German power metal band Helloween in 1998 for their cover album Metal Jukebox, and was featured in the single for their cover of ABBA's "Lay All Your Love On Me".
 Italian power metal band Eldritch presented their version of the song as a bonus track in their album Neighbourhell, released in 2006.
 Heavy metal band Five Finger Death Punch covered the song that appeared on The Way Of The Fist: Iron Fist Edition of their debut album and as a bonus track for the UK and Canada release. This version was later included on the soundtrack to the 2012 superhero film The Avengers.
 Finnish classical/cello metal band Apocalyptica covered this song for their 1998 album Inquistion Symphony.
 Skindred covered the song on the 2015 album Kerrang! Ultimate Rock Heroes.

In popular culture
 The song was used in the video games Madden NFL 2005 and NHL 2005.

References

Faith No More songs
1989 songs
1989 singles
1990 singles
Glam metal songs
American hard rock songs
London Records singles
Slash Records singles
Songs written by Billy Gould
Songs written by Mike Patton
Songs written by Roddy Bottum